Barwani Assembly constituency is one of eight assembly constituencies in the Khargone (Lok Sabha constituency), this assembly constituency is numbered 190 amongst 230 constituencies. It is reserved for the candidates belonging to the Scheduled Tribes.

Currently this seat belongs to Bharatiya Janta Party candidate Premsingh Patel who won in last Assembly election of 2018 Madhya Pradesh Legislative Elections defeating Independent candidate Rajan Mandloi by a margin of 38,787 votes.

Members of Legislative Assembly

Election Results

General election 2013

See also
 Barwani

References

Assembly constituencies of Madhya Pradesh